The 2021–22 Belgian Division 2 is the sixth season of the division in its current format, placed at the fourth-tier of football in Belgium. As the previous season was cancelled in January 2021 due to governmental measures against COVID-19 prohibiting amateur football, the division features nearly exactly teams.

As before the division consists of three separate leagues of 16 teams each. Leagues VFV A and VFV B consist of teams with a license from the Voetbalfederatie Vlaanderen (VFV, the Flemish/Dutch speaking wing of the Belgian FA), while the ACFF league contains teams with a license from the Association des Clubs Francophones de Football (ACFF, the French-speaking wing of the RBFA). The champions from each of the three leagues will be promoted to the 2022–23 Belgian National Division 1.

Team changes

In
No new clubs entered as the previous season was cancelled.

Out
 Following legal proceedings, Virton was reinstated into the Belgian First Division B.

Mergers
 AFC Tubize merged with Stade Braine (which was playing at a lower level) to become Royale Union Tubize-Braine, known as Tubize-Braine.
 Spouwen-Mopertingen de facto merged with Bilzerse Waltwilder (which was playing at a lower level) to become S.V. Belisia, known as Belisia. In strict sense it is not a merger, as Bilzerse Waltwilder continues to exist, playing only in the youth competitions under the new name Bilzen Youth.
 Heur-Tongeren merged with SK Tongeren Jeugd to reinstate the former Tongeren and continue under that name.

Belgian Division 2 VFV A

League table

Belgian Division 2 VFV B

League table

Belgian Division 2 ACFF

League table

Promotion play-offs

Promotion play-offs VFV
The teams finishing in second place in the Belgian Division 2 VFV A and Belgian Division 2 VFV B take part in a promotion playoff first round together with three period winners from these both divisions. These 8 teams from the VFV play the first round of a promotion-playoff, with two teams qualifying for the Promotion play-offs Final. 

In division A, champions Petegem and runners-up Ninove each won one period title, with Olsa Brakel taking the third one. As a result, in theory Lokeren-Temse and Zwevezele would be joining the playoffs together with Ninove and Olsa Brakel. Petegem however had not applied for a license and could hence not be promoted, with Ninove taking its place. Furthermore, Petegem did not enter the Promotion play-offs (although they could have, despite not being eligible for promotion). Zwevezele folded as a team and also vacated their place, meaning in the end Olsa Brakel was joined by Lokeren-Temse, Zelzate and Merelbeke. Of these four teams, only Lokeren-Temse was eligible for promotion as the others had not applied for a license.

In division B, second place finishers Eendracht Aalst were joined by Lyra-Lierse (3rd) and Cappellen (4th) who had each won a period title. The final spot was completed by the highest finisher not already qualified, 5th place Belisia. Of these four teams, Cappellen was not eligible for promotion due to not applying for a license, meaning that overall, only four of the eight teams participating in the Promotion play-offs VFV would be allowed to take a place in the Promotion play-offs Final.

VFV Round 1

Olsa Brakel, Eendracht Aalst, Belisia and Lyra-Lierse Berlaar qualified for the VFV second round promotion play-offs.

VFV Round 2

Olsa Brakel and Eendracht Aalst qualified for the promotion play-offs Final. Olsa Brakel however was ineligible due to not applying for a licence to play at a higher level. Therefore a third round match was held between the losers of round 2.

VFV Round 3

Lyra-Lierse Berlaar qualified for the promotion play-offs Final, together with Round 2 winner Eendracht Aalst.

Promotion play-offs ACFF
Meux, as team finishing in second place in the Belgian Division 2 ACFF qualified for the Promotion play-offs ACFF, as well as  Tubize-Braine (4th overall) for winning the third period. The two other periods were won by champions RAAL La Louvière and hence 3rd and 5th placed teams Warnant and Rebecq were invited as well. Prior to the start of these play-offs however, both Meux and Warnant were already ineligible for promotion as they had not applied for a license for the level above, while Rebecq had been refused a license but had appealed this decision. In case the appeal was not successful, Tubize-Braine would automatically qualify for the Promotion play-offs Final from ACFF side, however the appeal decision was only announced on 20 May while the ACFF Round 1 matches were already scheduled for 8 May.

ACFF Round 1

Warnant and Rebecq qualified for ACFF Round 2.

ACFF Round 2

With Warnant ineligible for promotion, the Round 2 match was effectively useless and Rebecq would choose a lineup of youngsters, knowing they had already won the right to take part in the Promotion play-offs Final. On 20 May 2022 however, the final verdict of the license appeal was that Rebecq would not be awarded a license for the Belgian National Division 1, making them also ineligible for promotion. With Tubize-Braine now the only team from ACFF with a license, despite losing in an earlier round, they took over the place of Rebecq.

Promotion play-offs Final
The two winners of the Promotion play-offs on the VFV side (Eendracht Aalst and Lyra-Lierse Berlaar) and Tubize-Braine, the only team with a valid license taking part in the ACFF Promotion play-offs played a final tournament together with the team that finished in 14th place in the 2021–22 Belgian National Division 1 (Mandel United). The winner of this play-off promotes to (or remains in) the 2022–23 Belgian National Division 1. As Mandel United is a team from the VFV side, there will be an extra VFV team relegating from the 2022–23 Belgian Division 2 in case the team from the ACFF side (Tubize-Braine) gets promoted. The losing team of the Relegation play-offs, Pepingen-Halle, hence had to hope Tubize-Braine would not win the Promotion play-offs Final.

Final Round 1

Mandel United won 2–1 on aggregate and moves on to Final Round 2, Eendracht Aalst remains in the Belgian Division 2.

Tubize-Braine won 2–1 on aggregate and moves on to Final Round 2, Lyra-Lierse Berlaar remains in the Belgian Division 2.

Final Round 2

Mandel United won 8–2 on aggregate and thereby secures its stay in the 2022–23 Belgian National Division 1, while Tubize-Braine is denied promotion and remains in the Belgian Division 2.

Relegation play-offs
The number of teams relegating from the Belgian Division 2 in each wing (VFV and ACFF) depends on the number of teams of each wing relegating from the Belgian National Division 1. 

In case Mandel United, taking part in the Promotion play-offs Final and also from VFV side is relegated and replaced by a team from ACFF side, then an extra VFV team will be relegated from the 2021–22 Belgian Division 2. On ACFF side on the other hand, no extra relegations would be necessary and only the three bottom teams the ACFF division would be relegated.

Relegation play-offs VFV
The teams finishing 14th in divisions A and B played each other in a single match to avoid relegation, with the winning team spared of relegation while the losing team relegating in case a team from the ACFF wing would win the Promotion play-offs Final, to be completed later that month.

Wetteren was spared of relegation, Pepingen-Halle had to await the result of the Promotion play-offs Final.

Relegation play-offs ACFF
As there is only one division no playoff was organised, furthermore no extra relegations were necessary hence only the bottom three teams from the ACFF division were relegated.

Number of teams by provinces

References

Belgian Second Amateur Division
Bel
4